Arenga engleri, or the Formosa palm, Taiwan sugar palm, dwarf sugar palm, or Taiwan arenga palm, is a species of flowering plant in the family Arecaceae. The plant rarely grows more than 10 ft. tall, with a stem diameter of 6in. and a spread of 16 ft. The palm is native to Taiwan as well as Japan's Ryukyu Islands. The fruit of the palm is known to cause a severe allergic reaction.

References

engleri
Flora of Taiwan
Taxa named by Odoardo Beccari